"Bullet" is the debut solo single by Christian Burns, released in 2012. The song has since been remixed by KhoMha, Mischa Daniels, Dirt Cheap, Sven Kirchkof and Falko Niestolik. It is included on Burns's first solo album Simple Modern Answers.

Track listing

References

2012 songs
2012 debut singles
Christian Burns songs
Songs written by Christian Burns
Armada Music singles